Alexandros Nikolaidis (born August 21, 2002) is a Greek professional basketball player for Lavrio of the Greek Basket League, on loan from Olympiacos. He is a 1.90 m (6'2 ") tall combo guard.

Professional career
After playing in the Greek minor leagues with Mandoulides, Nikolaidis began his pro career in 2019, during the 2019–20 season, with the Greek 2nd Division club Olympiacos B Development Team, which is the reserve team of the Greek EuroLeague club Olympiacos Piraeus. Nikolaidis made his EuroLeague debut, with Olympiacos Piraeus, on 4 February 2020, in a EuroLeague 2019–20 season game versus the Lithuanian League club Žalgiris Kaunas. He replaced Georgios Printezis, as the youngest Greek born Olympiacos player to ever play in a EuroLeague game, and the second youngest Olympiacos player to ever play in a EuroLeague game overall, after Aleksej Pokuševski.

On August 16, 2021, Nikolaidis was loaned to Lavrio for the 2021-2022 season. In 21 league games, he averaged 6.9 points, 2.1 rebounds, 2.3 assists and 1.4 steals, playing around 19 minutes per contest. On September 17, 2022, his loan agreement was renewed for another season.

National team career
Nikolaidis was a member of the junior national teams of Greece. With Greece's junior national teams, he played at the 2018 FIBA Under-16 European Championship, and the 2019 FIBA Under-18 European Championship.

Personal life
Nikolaidis' father, Sotos, is a former professional basketball player and a coach, and his brother Apostolos (b. 2006) is also professional basketball player. During his club playing career, Nikolaidis' father played five seasons in Europe's top level EuroLeague competition, with the Greek clubs PAOK Thessaloniki and AEK Athens. As a youth, Nikolaidis' basketball idol was Vassilis Spanoulis.

References

External links
EuroLeague.net profile
Eurobasket.com profile
RealGM.com profile

2002 births
Living people
Greek men's basketball players
Lavrio B.C. players
Olympiacos B.C. B players
Olympiacos B.C. players
Point guards
Shooting guards